SC Verl is a German association football club based in Verl, North Rhine-Westphalia. The club was founded on 6 September 1924, and since 1970 has consistently played in the higher echelons of amateur football. The club was promoted to the professional 3. Liga in 2020.

History
After almost 50 years of comparably insignificant existence, SC Verl advanced to the Landesliga Westfalen (IV) in 1970. Since then, SC Verl have been relegated only once (in 2003), qualified for newly introduced higher-class leagues three times out of four, won their league twice, and played the promotion round for 2. Bundesliga once (in 1991). Had they advanced, SC Verl would have been the smallest town ever to field a German pro football team. Their second bid for advancing to professional football was the 1994–95 season, when they finished second in the newly formed Regionalliga Nord (III), six points behind Arminia Bielefeld.

German Cup appearances
SC Verl have appeared in the DFB-Pokal (German Cup) tournament six times. In 1979, they defeated VfB Oldenburg (III) and Spvgg Elversberg (IV) before going out to Stuttgarter Kickers (II). In 1992, they lost an all-amateur match in the first round. In 1999, they eliminated the Bundesliga club Borussia Mönchengladbach 6–5 on penalties, with Arne Friedrich scoring the decisive penalty. They were defeated by the Bundesliga side Eintracht Frankfurt in the second round. In both their fourth (2007) and fifth (2010) appearances, they lost their first round matches against TSV 1860 Munich (II) – in the 2010 match by 2–1 after they led 1–0 at half-time.

In the 2019–20 season Verl caused a major upset by beating the Bundesliga club Augsburg 2–1 in the first round and 2. Bundesliga Holstein Kiel on penalties in the second round., before losing 1–0 to Union Berlin.

Relegation and Non-Qualification
In 2003, a 15th-place finish in the Regionalliga Nord (III) saw the team relegated for the first time in over thirty years. Some dispute surrounds Verl having to play the last game of the season in Paderborn during torrential rain, while Hamburger SV II were able to claim unplayable conditions and played the next day, securing a victory against KFC Uerdingen to remain in the league.

SC Verl had to play the Oberliga Westfalen (IV) for four years before winning the championship and advancing to Regionalliga again in 2007. One season later, the 3. Liga was introduced between the 2. Bundesliga and the Regionalliga, which in turn was split up from two into three divisions. SC Verl suffered through a poor 2007–08 campaign, finishing 18th and failing to qualify for the 3. Liga.

2009 European football betting scandal
Two SC Verl games from the 2008–09 season – among over two hundred games by other clubs – were suspected of having been rigged by players, leading to significant attention by the press as, for several days, SC Verl was the only club actually named. The two players accused were summarily suspended, and their contracts were eventually terminated.<ref>[http://www.scv-fans.de/03c1989d290cc7b01.php SC Verl kündigt Hagedorn] in: Westfalenblatt, 24 February 2010</ref>

Amateur success
Having played at least fourth tier level since 1970, with 17 consecutive seasons in the third tier, makes SC Verl one of the most consistent top teams of Germany's amateur football. One of the smallest cities to field a fourth-tier football team, and together with neighbouring club SC Wiedenbrück one of only two clubs in the Regionalliga West working under amateur conditions (both players and coaches have day-time jobs), the club is without any liabilities – a direct result of a continued policy of "no credit financing".

The club achieved mid-table finishes for their first eleven seasons in the Regionalliga West after 2008.

Into 3. Liga

In the truncated 2019–20 season, the club finished second on the points-per-game rule, but advanced to the promotion play-offs after first-placed SV Rödinghausen declined to apply for a licence to play in the 3. Liga. Verl then beat Lokomotive Leipzig on away goals to win promotion to the 3. Liga for the first time.

In their first professional season, SC Verl was considered a safe bet to immediately relegate back to fourth tier. Instead, they played an extremely strong season and finished 7th. Their second season went much less smoothly, and they secured a third season only in the last match of the season, playing 1:1 against MSV Duisburg.

Honours
The club's honours:
 Oberliga Westfalen
 Champions: 1991, 2007
 Westphalia Cup
 Winners: 1992, 1999, 2007

Players
Current squad

Out on loan

Famous players
SC Verl has seen many players who would go on to pro careers, the most notable being Arne Friedrich who played his last amateur season with the club before joining Arminia Bielefeld in 2000. He would go on to appear for the national side and captained Hertha BSC Berlin''.

International players
 Musemestre Bamba, 3 A-Games for the Democratic Republic of the Congo national football team
 Ousseni Labo, 6 A-Games for the Togo national football team
 Etienne Barbara, 30 A-Games for the Malta national football team
 Heinrich Schmidtgal, 15 A-Games for the Kazakhstan national football team

Stadium
After its establishment in 1924 and through part of the 1930s, SC Verl played at Auf der Heide. Sometime in the 1930s they moved to Birkenallee, where they remained until the end of World War II in 1945. Between 1945 and '55 their home ground was the Sportplatz Poststraße, and after 1955 the Stadion an der Poststraße. After capturing the Amateuroberliga Westfalen title in 1991, the team played its promotion round matches in the Heidewaldestadion Gütersloh in its failed attempt to advance to the 2. Bundesliga (as the Poststraße was not up to the task both capacity- and security-wise). The Stadion an der Poststraße was last expanded in 2015–16 to a capacity of 5,153, and renamed "Sportclub-Arena".

Rivalries
SC Verl followers share a heartfelt rivalry with nearby FC Gütersloh whose supporters look down on the "village club", while SCV supporters in their turn tease the "big city club" over its inconsistent performance and financial woes.

References

External links

 
Das deutsche Fußball-Archiv historical German domestic league tables 
Abseits Guide to German Soccer

 
Football clubs in Germany
Football clubs in North Rhine-Westphalia
Association football clubs established in 1924
1924 establishments in Germany
Gütersloh (district)
3. Liga clubs